Judge Dredd: Trapped on Titan is a Big Finish Productions audio drama based on the character Judge Dredd in British comic 2000 AD.

Plot
Judge Dredd goes undercover as a new inmate of the Titan penal colony, investigating the prison's new, corrupt administrators, and an alien artifact hidden on the planet's surface that threatens the safety of Earth itself.

Cast
Toby Longworth - Judge Dredd
Nicola Bryant - Judge Mordin
Andrew Fettes - Honest Bob
Jack Galagher - Riley
Alfred Hoffman - Jude
Adam Blaug - Malcolm
Laurence Bouvard - Stacey Dolan

References

External links
Big Finish Productions

2002 audio plays
Judge Dredd